The All-National Congress of the Chechen People (NCChP) of the Chechen Republic of Ichkeria came to power on 1 November 1991 under president Dzhokhar Dudayev, a former commander of the Soviet air force base in Tartu, Estonia. Since its formation, the organization advocated sovereignty for Chechnya as a separate republic within the Soviet Union. During the period of Soviet breakup, it switched this to explicit support for the separation of "Ichkeria" from Russia. 

On 7 September 1991, the NCChP National Guard seized government buildings and the radio and television center. They stormed a session of the Chechen-Ingush ASSR Supreme Soviet, which caused the death of the Soviet Communist Party chief for Grozny, Vitali Kutsenko, who was either thrown out of a window or fell trying to escape, and effectively dissolved the government of the Chechen-Ingush ASSR. Between 1991 and 2000 Chechnya was de facto an independent state.

See also
Politics of Chechnya

References

1991 establishments in Russia
1991 establishments in the Soviet Union
Chechen nationalism
Chechen Republic of Ichkeria
Political organizations based in the Soviet Union
National liberation movements
Organizations established in 1991
Political organizations based in Russia
Politics of Chechnya
Secessionist organizations in Europe
Indigenous rights organizations in Europe